The 2000 World Men's Curling Championship (branded as 2000 Ford World Men's Curling Championship for sponsorship reasons) was held at the Braehead Arena in Renfrew, Scotland from April 1–9, 2000.

Teams

Round robin standings

Round robin results

Draw 1

Draw 2

Draw 3

Draw 4

Draw 5

Draw 6

Draw 7

Draw 8

Draw 9

Playoffs

Brackets

Final

References
 

World Men's Curling Championship
W
Ford World Mens Curling Championship, 2000
International sports competitions in Glasgow
April 2000 sports events in the United Kingdom
2000s in Glasgow
International curling competitions hosted by Scotland
Sport in Renfrewshire